The Team relay race of the 2016 FIL World Luge Championships was held on 31 January 2016.

Results
The race was started at 14:03.

References

Team relay